Persicula albomaculata is a species of sea snail, a marine gastropod mollusk, in the family Cystiscidae.

References

albomaculata
Gastropods described in 1911
Cystiscidae